Amanah Raya Berhad is a Malaysian trustee company, wholly owned by the Government of Malaysia.

History 

Amanah Raya Berhad is Malaysia’s premier trustee company wholly owned by the Government of Malaysia, under the purview of the Ministry of Finance.

Established in 1921 as the Department of Public Trustee and Official Administrator, the company was corporatized in 1995.

In 2021, a public accounts committee found that the company lost RM114.34m in 2019 as a result of making investments without Investment Committee approval. Following the report, Amanah Raya Berhad was advised to conduct an audit, and on 13 June 2022 a follow-up report was presented to parliament.

Subsidiaries

Capital markets
 AmanahRaya Investment Management Sdn Bhd (formerly known as AmanahRaya - JMF Asset Management Sdn Bhd)
 Amanah Raya Capital Sdn Bhd
 AmanahRaya Investment Bank Ltd
 AmanahRaya - REIT Managers Sdn Bhd

Property management
 AmanahRaya Hartanah Sdn Bhd
 AmanahRaya Development Sdn Bhd

Trust management
 AmanahRaya Trustees Berhad
 Amanah Raya (Labuan) Limited

Strategic partnerships
 Bank Islam Malaysia Berhad
 Malaysia Building Society Berhad
 Bank Persatuan Malaysia Berhad
 SME Bank Berhad
 Kuwait Finance House
 Bank Simpanan Nasional
 Affin Islamic Bank Berhad
 AgroBank Berhad
 Bank Muamalat Malaysia Berhad
 Hong Leong Islamic Bank Berhad
 Bank Kerjasama Rakyat Malaysia Berhad
 Asian Finance Bank Berhad
 Al Rajhi Banking & Investment Corporation (M) Berhad
 Koperasi Pegawai-Pegawai Melayu Malaysia
 OCBC Al-Amin Bank Berhad
 Hong Leong Bank Berhad

References

External links
https://www.amanahraya.my/
Company Overview of Amanah Raya Berhad, bloomberg.com

Government-owned companies of Malaysia
Minister of Finance (Incorporated) (Malaysia)
Holding companies established in 1921
1921 establishments in British Malaya
Prime Minister's Department (Malaysia)
Privately held companies of Malaysia